Gavrilo II (1741–d. 1752) was Archbishop of Peć and Serbian Patriarch for a short time during the second half of 1752, having earlier served as the Metropolitan of Dabar-Bosnia since 1741.

Gavrilo, surnamed Mihailović (Михаиловић), was born at the beginning of 18th century into a Serb family in Sarajevo, at the time part of the Bosnia Eyalet. He took monastic vows and became one of the main aides of Metropolitan of Dabar-Bosnia Melentije Milenković. When Melentije died, Gavrilo succeeded him as metropolitan in 1741, serving under Serbian Patriarch Joanikije III (s. 1739–46). As a metropolitan, he made canonical visits to many places on the territory of his eparchy.

In 1752, because of high church taxes and other issues, he came into conflict with leaders of his flock in Sarajevo, who initiated the procedure for his removal, asking help from Serbian Patriarch Atanasije II (1747–1752). When Atanasije II soon died, Gavrilo took the opportunity to bid for the patriarchal throne and traveled to Constantinople in order to gain confirmation from the sultan. His success was short-lived. On 6 October he was confirmed as Patriarch, but soon upon return, he was struck with sudden illness and had to make succession arrangements with Metropolitan of Niš Gavrilo Nikolić. Ten days later, Patriarch Gavrilo II died and metropolitan Gavrilo Nikolić was elected new Serbian Patriarch as Gavrilo III.

References

Sources

External links
 Official site of the Serbian Orthodox Church: Serbian Archbishops and Patriarchs 

Gavrilo II
18th-century Serbian people
Serbs from the Ottoman Empire
1752 deaths
Bishops of Dabar-Bosnia
 People from Sarajevo